Aquatic Park Historic District is a National Historic Landmark and building complex on the San Francisco Bay waterfront within San Francisco Maritime National Historical Park.

The district includes a beach, bathhouse, municipal pier, restrooms, concessions stand, stadia, and two speaker towers.

Background
The District's San Francisco Maritime Museum building was built as a bathhouse in 1936 by the WPA; in streamline moderne style, its interior is decorated with fantastic, colorful murals. The Steamship Room illustrates the evolution of maritime technology from wind to steam, and there are displays of lithographic stones, scrimshaw, and whaling guns and photo-murals of San Francisco's early waterfront. A visitors gallery hosts such exhibitions as Sparks (2005), which showcased shipboard radio, radiotelephone, and radio-teletype equipment from over the years.

In front of the Maritime Museum is a man-made lagoon on the site of the former Black Point Cove. To the west is the horseshoe-shaped Municipal Pier, which was voted SFWeeklys Best Place to Go Fish 2009. The lagoon is fronted by a sandy beach and a stepped concrete seawall. To the south is a grassy area known as Victorian Park, which contains the Hyde Street cable car turnaround. Hyde Street Pier, though part of the San Francisco Maritime National Historical Park, is not part of Aquatic Park Historic District.

The Historic District was declared a National Historic Landmark in 1987, and added to the National Register of Historic Places on January 26, 1984.

The park is at the foot of Polk Street and a minute's walk from the visitor center and Hyde Street Pier. Its beach is one of the cleanest in the state.

In the park near the corner of Beach and Larkin streets is California Historical Landmark marker No. 236, honoring the Spanish packet ship San Carlos, which on August 5, 1775 was the first ship to enter San Francisco Bay.

Black Point Cove was named for Black Point, which juts into the bay between North Beach and the Marina District. Originally named Punta Medanos by the Spanish settlers, it was renamed Black Point after 1849. The shoreline of Black Point is the last remaining section of original coastline in San Francisco east of the Golden Gate Bridge.

Gallery

See also

South End Rowing Club
List of beaches in California
List of California state parks

References

San Francisco Maritime National Historical Park
Buildings and structures in San Francisco
Historic districts on the National Register of Historic Places in California
Fisherman's Wharf, San Francisco
Sports venues in San Francisco
National Register of Historic Places in San Francisco
Park buildings and structures on the National Register of Historic Places in California
National Historic Landmarks in the San Francisco Bay Area
Geography of San Francisco
Government buildings completed in 1936
Works Progress Administration in California
Streamline Moderne architecture in California
Event venues on the National Register of Historic Places in California